Pandit Pran Nath (Devanagari: पंडित प्राणनाथ) (3 November 1918 – 13 June 1996) was an Indian classical singer and master of the Kirana gharana singing style. Promoting traditional raga principles, Nath exerted an influence on notable American minimalist and jazz musicians, including La Monte Young, Terry Riley, and Don Cherry. He began performing in the United States in the 1970s, and established the Kirana Center for Indian Classical Music in 1972; he subsequently taught in various universities across the US and Europe.

Early life
Pran Nath was born into a wealthy family in Lahore in present-day Pakistan. While they were avid devotees of music, inviting musicians into the house to perform nightly, his family did not approve of his desire to become a musician, so he left home at the age of 13 and took up residence with the reclusive singer Abdul Wahid Khan of the Kirana gharana, cousin of the more widely known Abdul Karim Khan.

Pran Nath served Khan for seven years before he was accepted as a student, and stayed with Khan for nearly two decades. Both guru and disciple were much attracted to mysticism: Abdul Wahid Khan, a Muslim, to Sufism; and Nath, a Hindu, to a Shaivite sect in Dehra Dun. It is said that Nath lived in a cave near the Tapkeswhar temple to Shiva for five years, serving his guru intermittently. He eventually married and reentered the world at the request (guru dakshana) of his guru, in order to ensure the preservation of the Kirana style. In 1937, he became a staff artist with All India Radio.

However, Nath stuck to Abdul Wahid Khan's extra-methodical and austere singing style, with a heavy emphasis on alap and slow tempo, which suited his voice well but was not very popular. Like his teacher, Pran Nath's singing emphasized precise intonation and the gradual, note-by-note exposition of tone and mood in the alap section of the music.

Nath supported himself as a music teacher, and worked at the University of Delhi from 1960 to 1970.

Life in the United States
In 1970, Pran Nath travelled to New York to visit the American composer La Monte Young and visual artist Marian Zazeela, who heard his first issued recording, Earth Groove: The Voice of Cosmic India (1968). In 1972, he established the Kirana Center for Indian Classical Music in New York City and lived in the US for the rest of his life. He was a visiting professor of music at Mills College, teaching one semester a year from 1973 to 1984.

Pran Nath attracted a strong following among the American minimalist composers, including Terry Riley, Marian Zazeela, Michael Harrison (musician), Jon Hassell, Catherine Christer Hennix, Charlemagne Palestine, and Henry Flynt. Jazz musicians such as Don Cherry and Lee Konitz also drew influence from his teaching.

Notable students

Discography
 Earth Groove (1968), Ragas Bhupali and Asavari
 India's Master Vocalist (1972), Ragas Yaman Kalyan and Punjabi Berva
 Ragas of Morning and Night (1986), Ragas Miya ki Todi and Darbari Kanada, two ragas for which Pran Nath was particularly noted
 Midnight (2003), Raga Malkauns, two separate recordings made in 1971 and 1976
 The Raga Cycle (2006), Ragas Shudh Sarang and Kut Todi, recorded in 1972

Unreleased recordings
Like his teacher Abdul Wahid Khan, Pran Nath did not emphasize recording or the releasing of records, preferring live performance. While only three recordings of Pran Nath were released during his lifetime, a large number of recordings exist under the care of La Monte Young. In Pran Nath's will, Young, as executor of his estate, was instructed to begin releasing recordings.

Films
1986 – In Between the Notes: A Portrait of Pandit Pran Nath. Produced by Other Minds. Directed by William Farley.
1995 – Musical Outsiders: An American Legacy - Harry Partch, Lou Harrison, and Terry Riley. Directed by Michael Blackwood.

References

External links
MELA Foundation: Pandit Pran Nath
1986 - In Between the Notes: A Portrait of Pandit Pran Nath. Directed by William Farley.
On Pandit Pran Nath by Henry Flynt
Other Minds: Pran Nath
Pandit Pran Nath: Infinity’s Pathfinder By Marcus Boon
Pandit Pran Nath: A Short Biography By Joan Allekotte
Lord of the Drone: Pandit Pran Nath and the American Underground By Alexander Keefe

1918 births
1996 deaths
Hindustani singers
Singers from Lahore
Mills College faculty
Academic staff of Delhi University
20th-century Indian male classical singers
Kirana gharana
20th-century Khyal singers
Indian emigrants to the United States